Sir John Hotham, 9th Baronet, DD (1734–1795) was an English baronet and Anglican clergyman. He served in the Church of Ireland as the Bishop of Ossory from 1779 to 1782 and Bishop of Clogher from 1782 to 1795.

A member of the Hotham family, he was born in February or 16 March 1734, the son of Sir Beaumont Hotham, 7th Baronet. Following his education at Westminster School and Trinity College, Cambridge, he was the vicar of St Leonard's, Shoreditch and Archdeacon of Middlesex. He married Susanna Mackworth, daughter of Herbert Mackworth and Juliana Digby.

He was nominated Bishop of Ossory on 22 October 1779 and consecrated at St Patrick's Cathedral, Dublin on 14 November 1779; the principal consecrator was the Most Rev. Robert Fowler, Archbishop of Dublin, with the Rt. Rev. Charles Jackson, Bishop of Kildare and the Rt. Rev. Joseph Bourke, Bishop of Ferns and Leighlin serving as co-consecrators. Hotham was translated to the bishopric of Clogher by letters patent on 17 May 1782 and enthroned (by proxy) on 11 June 1782.

On the death of his brother Charles on 25 January 1794, John succeeded as the 9th Hotham Baronet of Scorborough.

He died in office of a paralytic stroke at Bath, Somerset on 3 November 1795, aged 61, and was buried at South Dalton, near Beverley in the East Riding of Yorkshire.

References

Bibliography

  
  
 
 
 

 
 
 
 
 
 
 
 
 

 
 
 

 
 
 

1734 births
1795 deaths
18th-century Anglican bishops in Ireland
Alumni of Trinity College, Cambridge
Archdeacons of Middlesex
Baronets in the Baronetage of England
Bishops of Clogher (Church of Ireland)
Anglican bishops of Ossory